The spotted jewel-babbler (Ptilorrhoa leucosticta) is a species of bird in the family Cinclosomatidae.
It is found in the highlands of New Guinea.
Its natural habitat is subtropical or tropical moist montane forests.

References

spotted jewel-babbler
Birds of New Guinea
spotted jewel-babbler
spotted jewel-babbler
Taxonomy articles created by Polbot